Delias enniana is a butterfly in the family Pieridae. It was described by Charles Oberthür in 1880. It is found in New Guinea.

Subspecies
D. e. enniana (western Irian Jaya)
D. e. contracta Talbot, 1928 (Waigeu)
D. e. hidehitoi Morita, 2003 (Salawati)
D. e. obsoleta Rothschild, 1915 (Misool)
D. e. majoripuncta Joicey & Talbot, 1922 (Numfoor Island)
D. e. reducta Rothschild, 1915 (Eilanden River, south-eastern Irian Jaya, south-western Papua New Guinea)
D. e. ecceicei Joicey & Talbot, 1916 (south-eastern Papua New Guinea)

References

External links
Delias at Markku Savela's Lepidoptera and Some Other Life Forms

enniana
Butterflies described in 1880